Stewart Springer (5 June 190623 August 1991) was an American ichthyologist and herpetologist. He was a world-renowned expert on shark behavior, classification (taxonomy), and population distribution.  More than 35 species of sharks, skates, rays, and other creatures are either classified by or named after him.

Education
Springer was a field naturalist, mostly self-taught. In 1964, 35 years after he dropped out of Butler University, Springer obtained a baccalaureate from George Washington University after having already achieved success in his chosen field of ichthyology.  Many colleagues and students addressed him as Dr. on the mistaken assumption that he must have a Ph.D. in biology or an allied field given his status in the world community of ichthyologists.

His exceptional interest in animal behavior was apparent early in his life, when at age 22, he identified and described a new species of lizard, Cnemidophorus velox, the plateau striped whiptail. His interest in the  whiptail was piqued, he said, by the fact that he was chaperoning a field trip with the Cottonwood Gulch Foundation in Arizona in 1928. His young team of Boy Scouts could catch jack rabbits and other lizards in the area, but could not catch this particular lizard. He had no idea that the plateau striped whiptail was a new species of a much studied genus that contained some species, among them C. velox, that were parthenogenic. He obtained his specimens for examination by shooting them with a .22 calibre rifle loaded with a specially concocted "dust shot" cartridge made by his cousin, Max Barnes, who was an ordnance expert for the United States Army. Thus, Springer's professional focus on animal behavior as a distinguishing characteristic in classification began not with sharks, but rather with a lizard. For an interesting discussion of whether or not C. velox  is a true species, see Everett's article (see below).

Early shark-related activities
Springer's early interest in herpetology was soon displaced, but not extinguished, by a lifelong fascination with sharks.  Having dropped out of college in 1929 as a sophomore, a friend and he headed south to Biloxi, Mississippi, where they hoped to collect and preserve animal specimens for zoological study in colleges.  They were interested in catching and selling dogfish, but soon discovered that dogfish were not to be found in Biloxi waters.

They learned of another shark species about the same size as Squalus called the sharpnose shark. Local fishermen called them "puppy sharks". They were able to catch many sharpnose sharks all about 3 ft (1m) in length and all males, which meant they could not fill their orders for equal numbers of males and females.  Over the following years, Springer found that among most of the shark species he studied, adult males and adult females did not live together. Typically, the males live in slightly cooler water or have separate migratory patterns that keep them separated from the females except during mating.

Publications
Stewart Springer published more than 80 papers on sharks, skates, and rays in a wide range of scientific journals including American Midland Naturalist, Copeia, Nature, Proceedings of the Indiana Academy of Science, the Florida Academy of Science, Science, Texas Journal of Science, UNESCO and various government agencies in the United States, New Zealand, and South Africa. During and after World War II, he engaged in commercial shark fishing when he was not working for the Office of Strategic Services   on a shark repellant called "Shark Chaser" or on survival manuals for the United States Navy.

Fishery work
In the 1940s, sharks were hunted commercially primarily for shark liver oil, a rich natural source of retinol, a dietary form of vitamin A, and for their fins used to make shark fin soup.  Some species of sharks also were valued for their hides from which a very tough and durable leather could be made.

From 1947 through 1949, Springer worked for Shark Industries, Inc. as an assistant production manager.  The company, bought out by the Borden Milk Co. in 1949, ceased operations shortly after, as vitamin A was first synthesized in 1947, while at the same time, the most sought-after shark species were being "fished out" in waters near the company's shark liver-processing plant at Port Salerno, Florida.

From 1950 to 1971, Springer worked for the U.S. Fish & Wildlife Service, Bureau of Commercial Fisheries, Department of the Interior, as a fishery methods and equipment specialist while continuing his research in the life history and behavior of sharks.

From 1950 to 1954, he was project manager for an exploratory fishing and gear development program for the bureau at Pascagoula, Mississippi. During his tenure there, the project was expanded, making notable progress in developing more effective fishing methods for shrimp and tuna in the Gulf of Mexico.  From 1955 to 1962, he served as Chief, Branch of Exploratory Fishing in the Bureau of Commercial Fisheries in Washington, DC.

Bachelor's degree
In 1961, Springer became interested in an opportunity in the bureau that would allow him to pursue further shark research in an academic setting on the Stanford University campus.  To qualify for the competitive civil service position as a fishery biologist, he needed at least a baccalaureate degree in the biological sciences.  At age 55, "Dr." Springer went back to school to get a bachelor's degree at the George Washington University.  From 1963 to 1967, Springer served as fishery biologist (research), U.S. Fish and Wildlife Service at Stanford, where he ran a shark-tagging program.  From 1968 to 1971, he served as a fishery biologist, National Marine Fisheries, at the National Museum in Washington, DC. This placed him in the enviable position, as a taxonomist, of being able to examine some of the very specimens he had personally collected and 'pickled' in earlier years first as a shark fisherman and later as a researcher.     
  
Stewart Springer retired from federal service in 1971, but he continued his research while employed by the Mote Marine Laboratory in Sarasota, Florida.  In April 1979, he completed his last major research project with publication by the National Marine Fisheries Service of "A Revision of the Catsharks, Family Scyliorhinidae." This paper covered a family of sharks that included (in 1979) 86 species and 17 genera.  Six new species and one new subspecies were described in this publication.

Special assignments
Springer served in 1960 as government advisor to the Rules of the Road delegation to the International Conference on Safety of Life at Sea.  From 1958 to 1970, he was a member of the American Institute of Biological Sciences, Shark Research Panel.  He was a co-founder of the Shark Attack File now maintained by George H. Burgess at the Florida Museum of Natural History.  In 1964, Springer was chief scientist, Cruise 8, International Indian Ocean Expedition aboard the research vessel Anton Brun.  From 1978 to 1980, he was a member of the Shark Panel, Gulf of Mexico Fishery Management Council.

Memberships
Fellow
American Association for the Advancement of Science; www.aaas.org
Memberships
American Elasmobranch Society,www.elasmo.org/(Distinguished Service Award);
American Institute of Fishery Research Biologists;www.aifrb.org/;
American Littoral Society; www.littoralsociety.org,
American Institute of Biological Sciences Shark Research Panel  www.dtic.mil/dtic/tr/fulltext/u2/719915.pdf
Research associateship
Florida Museum of Natural History

See also
:Category:Taxa named by Stewart Springer

Legacy
The broadnose wedgefish Rhynchobatus springeri is named after him.

References

External links
Cnemidophorus velox
Taxonomic Classification of Cnemidophorus velox Springer Based on Origins and Relative Age by Jesse Everett.
sharpnose shark
International Shark Attack File
George H. Burgess
Florida Museum of Natural History
American Association for the Advancement of Science
American Elasmobranch Society
American Institute of Fishery Research Biologists
American Littoral Society
Biographical Etymology of Marine Organism Names
;"Discovering Sharks: A volume honoring the work of Stewart Springer" Edited by Samuel H. Gruber, American Littoral Society, Highlands, New Jersey, 1991.

American ichthyologists
George Washington University alumni
1906 births
1991 deaths
Place of birth missing
Butler University alumni
20th-century American zoologists